These quarterbacks have started at least one game for the Jacksonville Jaguars of the National Football League. They are listed in order of the date of each player's first start at quarterback for the Jaguars.

Seasons

The number of games they started during the season is listed to the right:

Most games as starting quarterback
These quarterbacks have started for the Jaguars in regular season games (through the 2022 NFL season).

Career statistics

(Through the 2022 NFL season)(Ordered By Passing Yards)

See also 
List of Jacksonville Jaguars players

References

Jacksonville Jaguars

Quarterbacks